Benjamin Cassaigne (born 2 April 1976) is a former French tennis player.

Cassaigne has a career high ATP singles ranking of 302 achieved on 10 June 2002. He also has a career high ATP doubles ranking of 182 achieved on 3 March 2003.

Cassaigne has 1 ATP Challenger Tour title at the 2003 Challenger La Manche.

External links

1976 births
Living people
French male tennis players
Tennis players from Paris